Peyragudes is a large ski resort in the French Pyrenees, situated in the departments of Hautes-Pyrénées and Haute-Garonne, in the Region of Occitanie.

The resort was created in 1988, when the Peyresourde and Agudes resorts were joined.

Skiing
The resort is located on 2 sides of the same mountain, connected thru several lifts.

There are 18 ski lifts and 51 ski slopes:
 6 green slopes
 23 blue slopes
 18 red slopes
 4 black slopes

A major part of the resort is equipped with 230 snow-guns.

Skyvall is a new €30m gondola linking Loudenvielle in the Vallee du Louron to the mountain village at Peyragudes.

Cycling
The climb up to the ski-resort can be accessed from the D618 between Arreau and the Col de Peyresourde.

The climb was used on the 2010 Route du Sud, when David Moncoutié was the first rider to cross the line, going on to win the whole race.

Tour de France
In 2012, Peyragudes was the finish of Stage 17 of the Tour de France. First over the summit was  Alejandro Valverde, who went on to win the stage, with  Chris Froome and  Bradley Wiggins 19 seconds behind. Romain Bardet won the stage in the 2017 Tour, while Aru took the yellow jersey from Chris Froome. In the 2022 Tour Brandon McNulty broke the entire GC group with the exception of teammate Tadej Pogačar, who won the stage, and Jonas Vingegaard who retained the yellow jersey after finishing second on the stage.

Other Appearances in the Tour
The climb was also used in Stage 17 of the 2018 Tour de France, with Tanel Kangert first over the summit.

References

External links
Official website
Station de Peyragudes on  www.climbbybike.com

Ski areas and resorts in France
Hautes-Pyrénées
Haute-Garonne